Natthaweeranuch Thongmee (born October 28, 1979 in Thailand) nickname Ja, is a model, actress, VJ for Channel V Thailand. Her most recognized appearance was when she was one of the main characters of Shutter, the original Thai movie created in 2004.

Education
She graduate Bachelor of Political Science from Chulalongkorn University, Master in European studies from Chulalongkorn University. She graduated with a doctor of Political Sciences from Ramkhamhaeng University.

Career 
Her public acting career began when she appeared in her first movie, Koo tae Patihan. She additionally appeared in 'Shutter, a horror film made in Thailand.

Filmography
2003 Koo tae Patihan / The Whistle 
2004 Shutter                 
2006 Noodle Boxer                               
2012 I Miss U                         

 Television 
 2018 Mon Tra Lai Hong''

References

External links

1979 births
Living people
Natthaweeranuch Thongmee
Natthaweeranuch Thongmee
VJs (media personalities)
Natthaweeranuch Thongmee
Natthaweeranuch Thongmee
Natthaweeranuch Thongmee
Natthaweeranuch Thongmee
Natthaweeranuch Thongmee